Tylototriton pseudoverrucosus is a species of salamander in the family Salamandridae. It is known only from the Daliang Mountains of Ningnan County, southern Sichuan, China.

References

pseudoverrucosus